Ljubica Gabrić-Calvesi (17 October 1914 – 16 December 2015), known as Gabre Gabric, was an Italian track and field athlete who competed in the 1936 Summer Olympics and in the 1948 Summer Olympics. Her best discus throw was 43.35 m (1939).

Biography
Ljubica Gabrić was born in Imotski, Croatia (then part of Austria-Hungary). She was wife of Sandro Calvesi, an Italian athletic coach (hurdles), and mother-in-law of Eddy Ottoz (grandmother of Laurent Ottoz and Patrick Ottoz).

While many sources give a birth year of 1914 and she competed in masters-level tournaments with this year of birth, Gabrić claimed in an interview that she was born in 1917 and that 1914 was a transcription error: however, this admission is in contradiction with additional sources, including her arrival in the United States at age 9 in 1923, documented by Ellis Island records and the fact that Olympic documents dating to the 1936 and 1948 Olympics establish a birthdate of 17 October 1914, probably originating from her own answers at the time.

In 1936, she finished tenth in the Olympic discus throw event. Twelve years later she finished 17th in the discus throw competition at the 1948 Olympics. In the 1938 European Championships in Athletics she finished sixth in the discus throw contest and in the 1950 European Championships in Athletics she finished seventh in the discus throw event. Records from the European Championships use the 1917 birthdate, reporting her as a 20 year old and 32 year old respectively.

In 2010, she was still competing in Veterans Athletic Championships and, following the 2011 death of Alfred Proksch, was the last known track and field competitor from the 1936 Olympic Games to still be competing.  At the 2010 European Veterans Athletics Championships in Nyíregyháza, Hungary, she set the current W95 World Records in the Shot Put and the Discus.

Gabrić died on 16 December 2015, aged 101.

Masters world records
Gabric held four world records in masters W95 category (athletes who have completed the ninety-fifth year of age), records regularly recognized by the International Governing Body, World Masters Athletics. This is because for the World Masters Athletics and FIDAL (Italian athletics federation), recognize the birthdate of 1914.

Achievements

Senior

Masters

See also
List of world records in masters athletics
Ottoz family

References

External links
 

1914 births
2015 deaths
Italian female discus throwers
Italian centenarians
Italian people of Croatian descent
Olympic athletes of Italy
Athletes (track and field) at the 1936 Summer Olympics
Athletes (track and field) at the 1948 Summer Olympics
Italian masters athletes
World record holders in masters athletics
Sportspeople from Imotski
Yugoslav emigrants to the United States
Women centenarians
Croatian centenarians